Lammerville is a commune in the Seine-Maritime department in the Normandy region in northern France.

Geography

Coat of arms

Population

Places of interest
 The ruins of a feudal castle.
 An eighteenth-century manorhouse.
 The church of Notre-Dame, dating from the twelfth century.
 The remains of a watermill.

See also
Communes of the Seine-Maritime department

References

Communes of Seine-Maritime